A model parliament (also referred to as a mock parliament) is a simulation of  the parliamentary proceedings of a legislature or other deliberative assembly, often based upon the Westminster Parliamentary system. They can be similar to Model United Nations. Model parliaments can also be based on a specific national or subnational legislature. Model Parliaments are usually held as an educational tool to promote understanding of the working of government.

Model Parliaments have also been established to promote the activities of community service programmes or to advocate social or political change. The Canadian youth parliament movement was founded for the purpose of advancing youth programmes in Canada. In Australia the YMCA runs the YMCA Youth Parliament programs in every state and territory. Oxfam sponsors an "International Youth Parliament" to promote youth-led social change. As an example of the latter purpose, in 1914 the women's suffrage movement in Canada, under the leadership of Nellie McClung, organized a mock parliament to parody the refusal of the government of Manitoba to grant women the right to vote.

See also
Activism
YMCA Youth Parliament
Commonwealth Youth Parliament
European Youth Parliament
UK Youth Parliament

References

 
Youth-led organizations